A tree deity or tree spirit is a nature deity related to a tree. Such deities are present in many cultures. They are usually represented as a young woman, often connected to ancient fertility and tree worship lore. The status of tree deities varies from that of a local fairy, ghost, sprite or nymph, to that of a goddess.

Examples of tree deities
The Yakshis or Yakshinis, mythical maiden deities of Hindu, Buddhist, and Jain mythology are closely associated with trees, especially the ashoka tree and the sal tree. Although these tree deities are usually benevolent, there are also yakshinis with malevolent characteristics in Indian folklore.

Panaiveriyamman, named after panai, the Tamil name for the Palmyra palm, is an ancient fertility deity linked to this palm that is so important in Tamil culture. This deity is also known as Taalavaasini, a name that further relates her to all types of palm trees.
Some other Tamil tree deities are related to ancient agricultural deities, such as Puliyidaivalaiyamman, the deity of the tamarind tree, and Kadambariyamman, associated with the kadamba tree. These were seen as manifestations of a goddess who offers her blessings by giving fruits in abundance.

In Thailand the village ghosts or fairies related to trees such as Nang Takian and Nang Tani are known generically as Nang Mai (นางไม้). There are also other tree ghosts that are male.

Tree deities were common in ancient Northern European lore. In Charlemagne's time, following the Capitulatio de partibus Saxoniae in 782 offerings to sacred trees or any other form of worship of the spirits of trees and springs were outlawed. Even as late as 1227 the Synod of Trier decreed that the worship of trees and sources was forbidden.

List of tree deities
Tree deities in different cultures of the world include:
Anito, various animistic nature spirits in indigenous Philippine mythology are commonly believed to reside in balete trees
Bà Mộc, Vietnamese goddess of trees
Druantia, hypothetical Gallic tree goddess proposed by Robert Graves in his 1948 study The White Goddess; popular with Neopagans
Dryads and hamadryads of Greek mythology
Hathor, also called Lady of the Sycamore in the Old Kingdom of Egypt
Jinmenju, a tree with human-faced fruits in Japanese mythology
Kodama and Kurozome, the spirit of the Prunus serrulata (Japanese cherry)
Kukunochi, Japanese tree spirit
Lauma, a woodland fae, goddess/spirit of trees, marsh and forest in Eastern Baltic mythology
Leshy, is a tutelary deity of the forests in pagan Slavic mythology along with his wife Leshachikha(or the Kikimora) and children (leshonki, leszonky).
Meliae, the nymphs of the Fraxinus (Ash tree) in Greek mythology
Metsaema, mother of the forest in Estonian mythology
Metsavana, old man of the forest in Estonian mythology
Mielikki, goddess of the forests in Finnish mythology
Nang Ta-khian, related to the Hopea odorata (Ta-khian tree) in Thai folklore
Nang Tani, an ambiguous female spirit who lives in the Musa balbisiana (wild banana tree)
Nariphon, a tree in Buddhist mythology which bears fruit in the shape of young female creatures
Penghou, an edible dog-shaped spirit in Chinese mythology
Pi-Fang, a Chinese tree deity
Rakapila, a sacred tree deity of Madagascar
Salabhanjika, another general term for Hindu tree nymphs
Sijou Euphorbia milii var. splendens the living embodiment of Bathoubwrai, the supreme deity in the Bathouist religion of the Bodo people or Mech of Assam and Nepal
Tāne-mahuta,  atua (deity) of the forests and birds and one of the children of Rangi-nui and Papa-tū-ā-nuku Maori mythology
Tapio, god of the forests in Finnish mythology

Gallery

See also
Akathaso
Ent
Nymph
Salabhanjika
Talking tree
Tree worship
Vegetation deity

References

External links
 

 

Lists of deities
Comparative mythology